Adem Mikullovci (21 December 1937 – 15 September 2020) was a Kosovan actor and politician. He was a member of the Parliament of the Republic of Kosovo. As an actor, he participated in the constellation of the actors of the former People's Provincial Theater of Kosovo (now Kosovo National Theater). After dropping out of studies at the Academy of Theater and Film in Belgrade in 1968, he returned to Pristina and started working at the theater. From that year (1968) to July 1990, Adem Mikullovci made a career with 45 main roles and about 70 roles in theatrical performances.

Theatrical career
Mikullovci belongs to the generation of Albanian actors of the former People's Provincial Theatre of Kosovo (now The National Theatre of Kosovo). After he terminated his studies at the Academy of Film and Theatre in Belgrade in 1968, he returned to the theater in Pristina, the capital of Kosovo, and began his acting career. From that year 1968 up to 1990, he played 45 main and 70 supporting roles in plays in Albanian, such as Waiting for Godot (1977), I'm Going to Hunt, The Man Who Saw His Death, Love, The Straw Hotel, End of the World, Fly in the Ear, and Ervehe. Mikullovci was also the producer of several theatrical plays, including After Death (Cajupi), The Age of Whiteness (D. Agolli), Dan The Devil, Angel Of The Station,  The Bed, and The Listener; a stand-up comedy produced in 2011.

Political career
In 1990 he was among the deputies of the Kosovo Assembly who promulgated the Constitutional Declaration of 2 July.

Mikullovci re-entered into politics when he joined Vetëvendosje in May 2017, a party he had been a long time supporter of. In the 2017 Kosovan parliamentary election, he won a seat in parliament. As the oldest person in parliament, he acted as the chairman of the assembly between June to September 2017 until full-time candidate Kadri Veseli was re-elected by parliament.

Death
Mikullovci died at 12:20 am on September 15th, 2020.

Work

Movies
 Proka - 1984 Kosovafilm - acting
 Kur pranvera vonohet - 1980 Kosovafilm - acting
 Era dhe Lisi - 1979 Kosovafilm - acting
 Crveni udar - 1974 Kosovafilm - acting
 Kad sam bio vojnik - 1969 Zastava Film - acting

TV production
 Kafeneja jonë - (TV Show) - acting
 Oda e Junikut - (TV Show) - directing/acting
 Duke pritur Godon - 1977 (TV Show) - acting
 Ditari i Lec pazhecit - 1975 (Comedy) - acting
 Qesh e ngjesh - 1982 (TV Show)
 Gëzuar viti i ri - 1976 (TV Show)
 Burlesque - (Comedy) - directing/acting''
 Çka Ka Shpija

Video production
 Vjeshtë e zymtë e profesor Nexhatit 2000
 Kur do të kthehet Remziu1999
 Katunar e shehërli2003
 Mahmutovitët e Rexhepovitët 2001
 Mëhalla jonë 2000
 Qëndresa
 Sadri Llapjani 2003
 Tëgjithë me ne
 Mësuesi1998
 Një pallto për babain tim në burg 1997
 Një buqet buzqeshje1999
 Të gjithë me ne 2002
 Martesa e Bariut 2005
 Humor për Librin
 Një nuse për Lisin 2007

References

External links 
Kosovafilm at IMDB

Adem Mikullovci at premiere.com
Adem Mikullovci in standup comedy-Slovenia
- promo
The Bed

1939 births
2020 deaths
Yugoslav male actors
Kosovan male film actors
Politicians from Vushtrri
Chairmen of the Assembly of the Republic of Kosovo
Vetëvendosje politicians
Kosovan actor-politicians